Knoutsodonta albonigra is a species of sea slug, a dorid nudibranch, a shell-less marine gastropod mollusc in the family Onchidorididae.

Distribution
This species was described from Banyuls-sur-Mer on the Mediterranean Sea coast of France. It has been reported from the Bay of Naples, Italy and the Catalan coast of Spain at Cadaqués and some other location in the Costa Brava.

References

Onchidorididae
Gastropods described in 1951